{{Infobox film
| name           = As You Desire Me
| image          = As you desire me.jpeg
| caption        = Original film poster
| director       = George Fitzmaurice
| producer       = George FitzmauriceIrving Thalberg
| writer         = Gene MarkeyLuigi Pirandello (play)
| starring       = Greta Garbo Melvyn Douglas  Erich von Stroheim  Owen Moore Hedda Hopper
| music          =
| cinematography = William H. Daniels
| editing        = George Hively
| distributor    = Metro-Goldwyn-Mayer
| released       = May 28, 1932
| runtime        = 70 minutes
| country        = United States
| language       = English
| budget         = $469,000
| gross          = $1,362,000<ref>The American Film Institute Catalog Feature Films: 1931-40 by The American Film Institute, c. 1993</ref>}}As You Desire Me''' is a 1932 American pre-Code film adaptation of the 1929 play by Luigi Pirandello released by Metro-Goldwyn-Mayer. It was produced and directed by George Fitzmaurice with Irving Thalberg as co-producer. The adaptation was by Gene Markey, the cinematography by
William H. Daniels, the art direction by Cedric Gibbons and the costume design by Adrian.

The film stars Greta Garbo and Melvyn Douglas, with Erich von Stroheim, Owen Moore and Hedda Hopper. The film's running time is about 70 minutes, making it the shortest of all Garbo's Hollywood films.

The film grossed $705,000 in the USA and grossed $657,000 elsewhere, it altogether grossed $1,362,000 and its profit was $449,000.

Plot
Budapest bar entertainer Zara is a discontented alcoholic who is pursued by many men but lives with novelist Carl Salter. A strange man (Tony) shows up on Salter's estate claiming that Zara is actually Maria, the wife of his close friend Bruno. Maria, Tony claims, had her memory destroyed during a World War I invasion ten years ago. Zara doesn't remember but leaves with Tony to Salter's dismay. Bruno, now an officer in the Italian army, tries to coax Maria's memory back on his large estate. No one is really sure if Zara is Maria, and when Salter shows up with a mental case that he claims is the real Maria, everyone on Bruno's estate is desperately searching for the truth.

ProductionAs You Desire Me'' is the first of three films teaming Garbo with actor Melvyn Douglas. It is also the only film in which Garbo appears as a blonde.

Cast (in credits order)
Greta Garbo as Zara / Maria
Melvyn Douglas as Count Bruno Varelli
Erich von Stroheim as Carl Salter
Owen Moore as Tony Boffie
Hedda Hopper as Ines Montari
Rafaela Ottiano as Lena
Warburton Gamble as Baron
Albert Conti as Captain
Roland Varno as Albert

References

External links
 

1932 films
American drama films
Metro-Goldwyn-Mayer films
1932 drama films
American films based on plays
Films based on works by Luigi Pirandello
American black-and-white films
Films directed by George Fitzmaurice
Films set in Hungary
Films produced by Irving Thalberg
Films about amnesia
Films about alcoholism
1930s English-language films
1930s American films